This page lists the municipal flags of Kantō region, Japan. It is a part of the List of Japanese municipal flags, which is split into regions due to its size.

Complete lists of Japanese municipal flags pages

 List of municipal flags of Hokkaidō
 List of municipal flags of Tōhoku region
 List of municipal flags of Kantō region
 List of municipal flags of Chūbu region
 List of municipal flags of Kansai region
 List of municipal flags of Chūgoku region
 List of municipal flags of Shikoku
 List of municipal flags of Kyūshū

Chiba Prefecture

Cities

Towns and villages

Historical

Gunma Prefecture

Cities

Towns and villages

Ibaraki Prefecture

Cities

Towns and villages

Historical

Kanagawa Prefecture

Cities

Towns and villages

Saitama Prefecture

Cities

Towns and villages

Utopian communities

Historical

Tochigi Prefecture

Cities

Towns

Historical

Tokyo Metropolis

Special wards

Cities

Towns and villages

Historical 

Municipal